Olimpia Ana Pía Sebastiani (27 February 1925 – 26 July 2015) was an Argentine pianist and composer.

She studied under teachers such as Alfredo Pinto, Juan Fanelli, Georges de Lalewicz, in her hometown of Buenos Aires. In 1941, Sebastiani composed and performed a concert for piano and orchestra. She was a member of the Beethoven Conservatory. His piano concertos took her to some of the most important music halls in the world, such as Carnegie Hall and Wigmore Hall.

She taught at the Ball State University School of Music.

Sebastiani died on 26 July 2015 in Buenos Aires at the age of 90.

References

1925 births
2015 deaths
Argentine pianists
Male pianists
Argentine women pianists
Argentine composers
People from Buenos Aires
Ball State University faculty
20th-century pianists
Burials at La Recoleta Cemetery
Argentine women composers
20th-century women pianists